Scenic State Park is a Minnesota state park near Bigfork in Itasca County. It encompasses  of virgin pine forests that surround Sandwick Lake and Coon Lake. It also includes portions of Lake of the Isles, Tell Lake, Cedar Lake, and Pine Lake. Established in 1921, the Ojibwe tribe had previously used the area for hunting. The park has places for camping, hiking, swimming, fishing, and canoeing.

National Register of Historic Places

The park includes two historic districts that are listed on the National Register of Historic Places. The Scenic State Park CCC/Rustic Style Service Yard is located on the western shore of Sandwick Lake and it is composed of four buildings on a  site. They include the Equipment Building (1934), Ice and Wood House (1934), Custodian's Cabin (1935), and the Tool & Equipment Building (1935). They include the Shelter Pavilion (1934-1935), Comfort Station (1934-1935), Naturalist's Cabin (1935), Shelter & Latrine (1935), Water Tower (1935), and the Stone Steps (1935). The ten buildings and structures in the park were constructed by the Civilian Conservation Corps (CCC) in the Rustic style. They were designed by G. Iverson, Edward W. Barber, and the National Park Service (NPS). This development started in 1933 and it was the first CCC state park camp to begin operating within Minnesota. The buildings, of log construction, received considerable acclaim from the NPS. The landscape design was also prepared by the National Park Service and is one of the most thorough and extensive designs executed by their landscape architects.

References

External links

Scenic State Park

1921 establishments in Minnesota
Civilian Conservation Corps in Minnesota
IUCN Category V
Park buildings and structures on the National Register of Historic Places in Minnesota
Protected areas established in 1921
Protected areas of Itasca County, Minnesota
Rustic architecture in Minnesota
State parks of Minnesota
Historic districts on the National Register of Historic Places in Minnesota
National Register of Historic Places in Itasca County, Minnesota